Lovebeat is the fourth solo studio album by Yoshinori Sunahara. It was released on Ki/oon Records on May 23, 2001.

Critical reception

Ken Hollings of The Wire wrote, "Sunahara's fourth solo album finds the Techno dreamer extraordinaire returning to basics in its reappraisal of origins and influences."

Snoozer placed the album at number 8 on the "50 Best Albums of the Year" list.

Track listing

References

External links
 

2001 albums
Yoshinori Sunahara albums
Ki/oon Records albums